Tissanga is a genus of moths in the family Eupterotidae.

Species
 Tissanga kiboriana Basquin & Darge, 2011
 Tissanga murphyi Bouyer, 2012
 Tissanga pretoriae (Distant, 1892)
 Tissanga zambiana Darge & Minetti, 2012

References

Eupterotidae
Moth genera